The Kulmbach by-election on May 14, 1950 was the first by-election for the Bundestag (Germany) that had been established 1949.  It was caused by the death of Friedrich Schönauer (SPD) April 4, 1950 who had been elected at the 1949 German federal election

Despite an increased result of the SPD, they lost the seat to Johannes Semler (CSU), who was supported by BP and FDP.

This by-election showed a strange effect in the German AMS electoral system of the first election. The SPD in Bavaria had won this seat in the first past the post constituency, but all seats are justified through proportional representation. By winning the Kulmbach seat at the by-election the CSU had technically greater representation than their 1949 results would have proportionally given them. This is a slight anomaly that the electoral law for the first Bundestag does not cater for, but was changed at the end of 1952.

Result

German Parliament Election result, 1949

References 

1950 elections in Germany
Kulmbach (district)
By-elections in Germany